Kingston University is a university in South West London, England.

Kingston University may refer to:

Queen's University at Kingston, Ontario, Canada
Several universities with campuses in Kingston, Jamaica:
International University of the Caribbean
Northern Caribbean University
University of Technology, Jamaica
University of the Commonwealth Caribbean